is a railway station in Takikawa, Hokkaidō, Japan.

Lines
Hokkaido Railway Company
Hakodate Main Line Station A22

Adjacent stations

Railway stations in Hokkaido Prefecture
Railway stations in Japan opened in 1898
Takikawa, Hokkaido